The  European Review for Medical and Pharmacological Sciences is a peer-reviewed medical journal. It is indexed and abstracted in Current Contents, Excerpta Medica, Index Medicus, MEDLINE/PubMed, Science Citation Index, and Scopus.

External links 
 

English-language journals
Publications established in 1997
General medical journals
Biweekly journals